The Maurician medal is an honorary degree granted to a soldier, after 50 years of service in the Italian army (the commanding years are added afterward). This medal was established by Carlo Alberto di Savoia, on 19 July 1839 on decree of the Regie Magistrali Patenti, with the name of "Maurician Medal to the Military Merit of Ten Lustrums".
It became official with royal decree of 21 December 1924. The "Maurician Medal to the Military Merit of Ten Lustrums" would then be replaced, by the law n. 203 of 7 May 1954 (modified by the law n. 1327 of 8 November 1956), with the "Maurician Medal to the merit of ten lustrums of military career".

The people who can receive this medal are the officers and non-commissioned officers belonging to the Carabinieri armed forces, the Italian Navy, the Italian Army, the Italian Air Force, the custom officers of Italy, and the Italian Police forces. General officers and flag officers receive a medal with a diameter of 52 millimeters (2 inches), while other recipients receive a medal with a diameter of 32 millimeters (1¼ inches).

In any other case, this medal is granted on decree of the president of the Italian Republic, on suggestion of the minister of defense, to any component of the Italian armed forces, together with the minister of interior and the minister of finance.

References 

2*The Maurician medal is granted on decree of the President of the Italian Republic, after 50 years (ten lustrums) of military career (not military service).

Bibliography 
  Giovanni Santi-Mazzini, Militaria - Storia delle potenze europee da Carlo Magno al 1914 ( History of great European governments from Carlo Magno to 1914 ), Milano, Mondadori, 2005,

External links 
Normative Sources
Medaglia Mauriziana al merito di dieci lustri di carriera militare

Military awards and decorations of Italy
Long service medals